, originally titled , is a Japanese manga written and illustrated by Hideaki Nishikawa based on Go Nagai and Ken Ishikawa classic Getter Robo series. It was initially serialized monthly in Kodansha's Magazine Z. As the title suggests, the story takes place in an alternate universe, where the concepts of the Getter series are seen under the perspective of Nishikawa. When Magazine Z ceased publication in early 2009 the story was moved to Hakusensha's monthly magazine Young Animal Arashi, starting in the July 2009 issue, with the title changed to Apocryphal Getter Robo Darkness. The chapters were renumbered at this time, with chapter 0 in Arashi being a reprint of chapter 6 in Magazine Z, the last chapter published there.

External links
Apocrypha Getter Robot Dash  at Kodansha Comics Plus
Getter Robot Apocrypha DASH, info e pagine d'anteprima  at Anime Click

2008 manga
Manga series
Getter Robo
Hakusensha manga
Kodansha manga
Seinen manga
Super robot anime and mangaā